Gabriel Nnamdi Vincent (born June 14, 1996) is a Nigerian-American professional basketball player for the Miami Heat of the National Basketball Association (NBA). He also plays for the Nigerian national basketball team. He played college basketball for the UC Santa Barbara Gauchos.

Early life
Vincent was born in Modesto, California, to Franklyn and Cynthia Vincent. His father is Nigerian and his mother is from Connecticut. They both earned doctorates in psychology. The youngest of three brothers, Vincent attended St. Mary’s High School in Stockton.

College career
Vincent played college basketball for UC Santa Barbara from 2014 to 2018, averaging 12.8 points in 113 games for the team. After his senior season, he was named to the 2018 Second Team All-Big West.

Professional career

Stockton Kings (2018–2020)
After graduating, Vincent had a pre-draft workout with the Sacramento Kings. Although he went undrafted in the 2018 NBA Draft, he signed an Exhibit 10 contract with the Sacramento Kings on October 2. He was waived a few days later
He played 24 games, with 3 starts, for the Stockton Kings of the G League during the 2018–19 season, averaging 8.8 points in 18.6 minutes per game. He scored 35 points in a game twice for the Kings in December 2019. Vincent played in 20 games (three starts) in his second season with Stockton while averaging 23.4 points, 3.8 rebounds, 2.5 assists, and 1.30 steals per game and shooting 46.9 percent from the field, 41.2 percent from three-point range and 89.7 percent from the free throw line.

Miami Heat (2020–present)
On January 8, 2020, the Miami Heat announced that they had signed Vincent to a two-way contract. He made his NBA debut against the Orlando Magic on January 29. In the G League, Vincent tallied 27 points, three assists and one rebound a win over the Salt Lake City Stars on February 3. He averaged 20.9 points, 3.1 rebounds and 2.3 assists per game in 31 G League games. On June 22, 2020, the NBA G League announced that Vincent won the Most Improved Player award. The Heat reached the 2020 NBA Finals, but lost in 6 games to the Los Angeles Lakers.

On August 1, 2021, Vincent joined the Heat for the NBA Summer League and five days later, he signed a standard contract with the Heat.

National team career
Vincent represents the Nigerian national team, D'Tigers. On August 24, 2019, he scored 23 points against Poland, including the game winning three pointer with 0.3 seconds left in the game.
He represented the Nigerian Team at the 2019 FIBA Basketball World Cup in China.

Career statistics

NBA

Regular season

|-
| style="text-align:left;"| 
| style="text-align:left;"| Miami
| 9 || 0 || 9.2 || .216 || .222 || – || .6 || .7 || .6 || .0 || 2.4
|-
| style="text-align:left;"| 
| style="text-align:left;"| Miami
| 50 || 7 || 13.1 || .378 || .309 || .870 || 1.1 || 1.3 || .4 || .0 || 4.8
|-
| style="text-align:left;"| 
| style="text-align:left;"| Miami
| 68 || 27 || 23.4 || .417 || .368 || .815 || 1.9 || 3.1 || .9 || .2 || 8.7
|- class="sortbottom"
| style="text-align:center;" colspan="2"| Career
| 127 || 34 || 18.3 || .396 || .343 || .831 || 1.5 || 2.2 || .7 || .1 || 6.7

Playoffs

|-
| style="text-align:left;"| 2020
| style="text-align:left;"| Miami
| 1 || 0 || .3 || – || – || – || .0 || .0 || .0 || .0 || 0.0
|-
| style="text-align:left;"| 2021
| style="text-align:left;"| Miami
| 3 || 0 || 4.7 || .667 || .500 || – || .3 || .7 || .0 || .0 || 1.7
|-
| style="text-align:left;"| 2022
| style="text-align:left;"| Miami
| 18 || 8 || 23.5 || .382 || .309 || .950 || 1.9 || 3.2 || .8 || .3 || 8.0
|- class="sortbottom"
| style="text-align:center;" colspan="2"| Career
| 22 || 8 || 19.9 || .388 || .313 || .950 || 1.6 || 2.7 || .6 || .2 || 6.8

References

External links

NBA G League profile
UC Santa Barbara Gauchos bio

1996 births
Living people
2019 FIBA Basketball World Cup players
African-American basketball players
American men's basketball players
American sportspeople of Nigerian descent
Basketball players at the 2020 Summer Olympics
Basketball players from Stockton, California
Miami Heat players
National Basketball Association players from Nigeria
Nigerian men's basketball players
Olympic basketball players of Nigeria
Point guards
Sioux Falls Skyforce players
Stockton Kings players
UC Santa Barbara Gauchos men's basketball players
Undrafted National Basketball Association players
21st-century African-American sportspeople